Hassan Bey Shukri (1876–1940) was the mayor of Haifa and the president of the Muslim National Associations.

Biography
Hassan Shukri was born in Jerusalem and moved to Haifa as a child. The Turks appointed him mayor of the city in 1914.
 
In July 1921, Shukri sent a telegram to the British government, declaring support for the Balfour Declaration and Zionist immigration to British Mandate Palestine:
We strongly protest against the attitude of the said delegation concerning the Zionist question. We do not consider the Jewish people as an enemy whose wish is to crush us. On the contrary. We consider the Jews as a brotherly people sharing our joys and troubles and helping us in the construction of our common country. We are certain that without Jewish immigration and financial assistance there will be no future development of our country as may be judged from the fact that the towns inhabited in part by Jews such as Jerusalem, Jaffa, Haifa, and Tiberias are making steady progress while Nablus, Acre, and Nazareth where no Jews reside are steadily declining.

In 1927, Shukri added Hebrew to municipal documents, which were formerly in Arabic. In 1933, he opened up city tenders to Jewish contractors.

In 1936, explosives were planted at his home. He escaped without injury, but several months later an Arab fired four shots at Shukri as he entered Haifa City Hall. While the assassination attempt failed, Shukri was shaken and fled to Beirut. When Shukri died on January 29, 1940, many of Haifa’s Jewish leaders attended his funeral.

References

Mayors of Haifa
Arab people in Mandatory Palestine